Lothar Woelk (born August 3, 1954) is a retired German football player. He played 420 games in the Bundesliga.

Career statistics

Honours
 DFB-Pokal finalist: 1987–88.

References

External links
 
 

1954 births
Living people
German footballers
VfL Bochum players
MSV Duisburg players
Bundesliga players
Association football defenders
People from Recklinghausen
Sportspeople from Münster (region)
Footballers from North Rhine-Westphalia